Anse d'Hainault is an arrondissement of the Grand'Anse Department located in southwestern Haiti. As of 2015, the population was 98,522 inhabitants. Postal codes in the Anse d'Hainault Arrondissement start with the number 72.

Municipalities
The arrondissement consists of the following municipalities:
 Anse d'Hainault
 Dame Marie
 Les Irois

See also
Arrondissements of Haiti

References

Arrondissements of Haiti